Chris Pusey (born June 30, 1965 in Brantford, Ontario) is a former professional ice hockey goaltender. He is notable for returning after retiring from professional ice hockey, with the Dundas Real McCoys, an OHA senior team, and the club made the final four in the Allan Cup tournament. Chris, however, was playing not as a goaltender, but as a defenceman. As a child, Chris was known to friends and family as "Gigger".

Chris was called up by the Detroit Red Wings in October 1985, after starter Eddie Mio went down with a knee injury. He made his only NHL appearance on October 19, 1985, against Chicago. Starter Corrado Micalef allowed three goals in the first period. Pusey entered the game and Detroit pulled to within one goal after two periods; however, three Chicago goals in the third (including the first NHL goal by defenceman Marc Bergevin) would end the Red Wing comeback bid.

Career statistics

Regular season and playoffs

See also
List of players who played only one game in the NHL

External links

Chris Pusey @ hockeygoalies.org

1965 births
Living people
Adirondack Red Wings players
Canadian ice hockey goaltenders
Detroit Red Wings draft picks
Detroit Red Wings players
Ice hockey people from Ontario
Sportspeople from Brantford